Massimo Castellani (born 16 October 1961) is an Italian diver. He competed in the men's 3 metre springboard event at the 1988 Summer Olympics.

References

1961 births
Living people
Italian male divers
Olympic divers of Italy
Divers at the 1988 Summer Olympics
Sportspeople from Verona